The World RX of Latvia is a Rallycross event held in Latvia for the FIA World Rallycross Championship. The event made its debut in the 2016 season, at the Biķernieku Kompleksā Sporta Bāze in Riga.

Past winners

References

External links
 Website of the venue
 Website of the event

Latvia
Motorsport competitions in Latvia
Autumn events in Latvia